Piskaborn is a subdivision (Ortschaft) of the town Mansfeld in Saxony-Anhalt, Germany. It was an independent municipality until 2005. The village has about 300 inhabitants and is situated in the valley of the Wipper.

References

Former municipalities in Saxony-Anhalt
Mansfeld